The 80th New York State Legislature, consisting of the New York State Senate and the New York State Assembly, met from January 6 to April 18, 1857, during the first year of John A. King's governorship, in Albany.

Background
Under the provisions of the New York Constitution of 1846, 32 Senators were elected in single-seat senatorial districts for a two-year term, the whole Senate being renewed biennially. The senatorial districts (except those in New York City) were made up of entire counties. 128 Assemblymen were elected in single-seat districts to a one-year term, the whole Assembly being renewed annually. The Assembly districts were made up of entire towns, or city wards, forming a contiguous area, all in the same county. The City and County of New York was divided into four senatorial districts, and 16 Assembly districts.

At this time there were two major political parties: the Democratic Party and the Republican Party. The Know Nothing movement ran in the election as the "American Party."

Elections
The New York state election, 1856 was held on November 4. Republicans John A. King and Henry R. Selden were elected Governor and Lieutenant Governor. The other three statewide elective offices were also carried by the Republicans. The approximate party strength at this election, as expressed by the vote on Governor was: Republican 265,000; Democratic 198,000; and American 130,000.

Sessions
The Legislature met for the regular session at the Old State Capitol in Albany on January 6, 1857; and adjourned on April 18.

DeWitt C. Littlejohn (R) was again elected Speaker with 79 votes against 35 for David R. Floyd-Jones (D), and 7 for Joseph B. Varnum, Jr. (A). William Richardson (R) was elected Clerk of the Assembly with 78 votes against 37 for John S. Nafew (D) and 7 for G. M. Stevens (A).

On January 24, Mark Spencer (D) was elected president pro tempore of the State Senate.

On February 3, the Legislature elected Preston King (R) to succeed Hamilton Fish as U.S. Senator from New York for a six-year term beginning on March 4, 1857.

On April 7, the Legislature elected Henry H. Van Dyck (R) to succeed Victor M. Rice as State Superintendent of Public Instruction.

On April 13, the Legislature re-apportioned the Senate districts, and the Assembly seats per county. Cayuga, Dutchess, Genesee, Greene, Montgomery, Onondaga, Orange, Otsego, Schoharie and Tompkins counties lost one seat each; New York, Oswego, Queens, Ulster and Westchester counties gained one seat each; Kings County gained four seats; and the new Schuyler County was apportioned one seat.

On April 15, the Legislature passed "An Act to establish a Metropolitan Police District, and to provide for the government thereof." This act re-organized, and unified, the police forces in New York City, Staten Island, Kings County and Westchester County. The Metropolitan Police was headed by a Board consisting of five Commissioners (appointed by the Governor, and confirmed by the Senate) and the Mayors of New York City and Brooklyn. At first, Mayor Fernando Wood did not recognize the Metropoplitan Police, and refused to disband the Municipal Police. The struggle led to the New York City Police Riot, but after the New York Court of Appeals upheld the Legislature's police law, Mayor Wood quietly agreed to abide by it.

State Senate

Districts

 1st District: Queens, Richmond and Suffolk counties
 2nd District: Kings County
 3rd District: 1st, 2nd, 3rd, 4th, 5th and 6th wards of New York City
 4th District: 7th, 10th, 13th and 17th wards of New York City
 5th District: 8th, 9th and 14th wards of New York City
 6th District: 11th, 12th, 15th, 16th, 18th, 19th, 20th, 21st and 22nd wards of New York City
 7th District: Putnam,  Rockland and Westchester counties
 8th District: Columbia and Dutchess counties
 9th District: Orange and Sullivan counties
 10th District: Greene and Ulster counties
 11th District: Albany and Schenectady counties
 12th District: Rensselaer County
 13th District: Saratoga and Washington counties
 14th District: Clinton, Essex and Warren counties
 15th District: Franklin and St. Lawrence counties
 16th District: Fulton, Hamilton, Herkimer and Montgomery counties
 17th District: Delaware and Schoharie counties
 18th District: Chenango and Otsego counties
 19th District: Oneida County
 20th District: Madison and Oswego counties
 21st District: Jefferson and Lewis counties
 22nd District: Onondaga County
 23rd District: Broome, Cortland and Tioga counties
 24th District: Cayuga and Wayne counties
 25th District: Seneca, Tompkins and Yates counties
 26th District: Chemung and Steuben counties
 27th District: Monroe County
 28th District: Genesee, Niagara and Orleans counties
 29th District: Livingston and Ontario counties
 30th District: Allegany and Wyoming counties
 31st District: Erie County
 32nd District: Cattaraugus and Chautauqua counties

Note: There are now 62 counties in the State of New York. The counties which are not mentioned in this list had not yet been established, or sufficiently organized, the area being included in one or more of the abovementioned counties.

Members
The asterisk (*) denotes members of the previous Legislature who continued in office as members of this Legislature.

Party affiliations follow the vote on U.S. Senator and Regent of the University.

Employees
 Clerk: Samuel P. Allen
 Sergeant-at-Arms: Samuel R. Tuell
 Assistant Sergeant-at-Arms: George W. Bedell
 Doorkeeper: William Coppernall
 Assistant Doorkeeper: Henry W. Shipman
 Second Assistant Doorkeeper: Victor M. Dearborn

State Assembly

Assemblymen
The asterisk (*) denotes members of the previous Legislature who continued as members of this Legislature. Richard U. Sherman, the Clerk of the Assembly during the previous Session, was elected a member.

Party affiliations follow the vote for Speaker.

Employees
 Clerk: William Richardson
 Sergeant-at-Arms: Norman P. Hitchcock
 Doorkeeper: Nathan Newhafer
 First Assistant Doorkeeper: Patrick Farrell
 Second Assistant Doorkeeper: John Lewis

Notes

Sources
 The New York Civil List compiled by Franklin Benjamin Hough (Weed, Parsons and Co., 1858) [pg. 109 for Senate districts; pg. 137 for senators; pg. 148–157 for Assembly districts; pg. 252ff for assemblymen]
 Journal of the Senate (80th Session) (1857)
 Journal of the Assembly (80th Session) (1857)
 Pen and Ink Portraits of the Senators, Assemblymen, and State Officers of New York by G. W. Bungay (1857)

080
1857 in New York (state)
1857 U.S. legislative sessions